Julius H. Huber (March 23, 1852 - October 21, 1939) was a prominent architect in Chicago, Illinois. He is especially known for his work in Edgewater, Chicago. Clarence Hatzfeld's early architectural training was largely in Huber's office. At least one building he designed is on the National Register of Historic Places. He is buried in Rosehill Cemetery. Huber designed churches, breweries, Brand’s Hall at Clark and Erie streets, residences, apartments, stores and office buildings. His firm also worked on coal sheds, docks, and coal-handling machinery.

Works
14-16 East Pearson duplex, listed on the National Register of Historic Places
14 East Chestnut townhouse (1895) (since demolished)
 621-627 ? (1887) a four-unit row house 
631 West Fullerton townhouse (1889)
163-173 West North Avenue (1886), a multi-unit 
1054 West Oakdale residence (1886) 
3221 S. Calumet (1885), converted into a Bed & Breakfast

Edgewater
He designed and lived in:
 5510 N. Magnolia
 5532 North Lakewood 
 5539 N. Wayne.

He designed 12 other houses in the Lakewood Balmoral addition to Edgewater developed by John Lewis Cochran.

Others projects included:
5222 North Lakewood residence (1898-1901)
4519 North Virginia residence (1916)
6640 Ashland (1916), a three-flat

References

American architects
1852 births
1939 deaths